M-Drive or M-Thruster or variation may refer to:

 Magnetohydrodynamic drive, MHD drive usually used to propel watercraft
Magnetoplasmadynamic thruster, MPD thruster usually used to propel spacecraft

See also
 Magnetodynamic force
 Magnetic Drive Pump
 Magsail
 Q-thruster